You've Got to Get On Jack is a 1970 revue by David Williamson for the Australian Performing Group. The original cast included Alan Finney and Bruce Spence. 

It received a good review by Katharine Brisbane in The Australian which Williamson remembers as the first positive encouragement he had received in print.

References

Plays by David Williamson
1970 plays